The 2016 South Dakota Coyotes football team represented the University of South Dakota in the 2016 NCAA Division I FCS football season. They were led by first-year head coach Bob Nielson and played their home games in the DakotaDome. They were a member of the Missouri Valley Football Conference. They finished the season 4–7, 3–5 in MVFC play to finish in a tie for sixth place.

Schedule

Source: Schedule

Game summaries

at New Mexico

Weber State

at North Dakota

at Youngstown State

Northern Iowa

at Indiana State

Illinois State

Western Illinois

at Southern Illinois

at South Dakota State

North Dakota State

Ranking movements

References

South Dakota
South Dakota Coyotes football seasons
South Dakota Coyotes football